Forgotten Gods (1993) is a first collaborative album by American ambient musicians Steve Roach, Jorge Reyes & Suso Saiz as Suspended Memories. Recorded and mixed at the Timeroom, Tucson, AZ. Mastered at Hearts of Space studio, San Francisco.

Reception 
AllMusic rated this album 5 stars, stating, "The album sounds really great when the volume is turned up. That way you can really feel the ominous power and all the nuances in the music."

Track listing

Personnel 
 Steve Roach, Jorge Reyes, Suso Saiz – performer, producer
 Steve Roach – didgeridoo, flute, percussion, sequencer, synthesizer, voice
 Jorge Reyes – drums, flute, ocarina, percussion, rainstick, voice, whistle
 Stephen Hill – artwork, design, mastering
 Jose Luis Crespo, Suso Saiz – editing
 Suso Sáiz – effects, electric guitar, percussion
 Linda Kohanov – liner notes
 Steve Roach, Suso Saiz – mixing, recording
 David Muench – photography

See also 
 Steve Roach
 Jorge Reyes
 Ambient music
 Electronic music

References

External links 
 Forgotten Gods at Hearts of Space Records
 Forgotten Gods at Bandcamp
 Forgotten Gods at Discogs

1993 albums
Steve Roach (musician) albums
Collaborative albums